Brian Gardiner may refer to:

 Brian G. Gardiner (biologist) (1934–2021), British palaeontologist and zoologist
 Brian G. Gardiner (meteorologist), British meteorologist
 Brian Gardiner (politician) (born 1955), former member of the Canadian House of Commons